Frederick Demarais  (November 1, 1866 – March 6, 1919) was a pitcher in Major League Baseball with the Chicago Colts of the National League. He pitched two scoreless innings for the Colts on July 26, 1890, in his only major league appearance. His minor league career lasted through 1894.

External links

1866 births
1919 deaths
19th-century baseball players
Baseball people from Quebec
Canadian expatriate baseball players in the United States
Chicago Colts players
Baseball players from Montreal
Major League Baseball pitchers
Major League Baseball players from Canada
Lynn Lions players
Salem Fairies players
Lynn Shoemakers players
Worcester Grays players
London Tecumsehs (baseball) players
Quincy Black Birds players
Quincy Ravens players
Peoria Distillers players
Seattle Hustlers players